George Henry Hubert Lascelles, 7th Earl of Harewood,  (7 February 1923 – 11 July 2011), styled The Honourable George Lascelles before 1929 and Viscount Lascelles between 1929 and 1947, was a British classical music administrator and author. He served as director of the Royal Opera House (1951–53; 1969–72), chairman of the board of the English National Opera (ENO) (1986–95); managing director of the ENO (1972–85), managing director of the English National Opera North (1978–81), governor of the BBC (1985–87), and president of the British Board of Film Classification (1985–96).

Harewood was the elder son of the 6th Earl of Harewood and Princess Mary, Princess Royal, the only daughter of King George V and Queen Mary. At his birth, he was 6th in the line of succession; at his death, he was 46th. Lord Harewood was the eldest grandchild of King George V and Queen Mary, nephew of both King Edward VIII and King George VI and first cousin of Queen Elizabeth II. He succeeded to his father's earldom on 24 May 1947.

Early life 
George Lascelles was born at his parents' London home of Chesterfield House on 7 February 1923, the first child of Henry, Viscount Lascelles, and Princess Mary, Viscountess Lascelles, and first grandchild of King George V and Queen Mary, who stood as sponsors at his christening. The christening took place on 25 March 1923 at St Mary's Church in the village of Goldsborough, near Knaresborough adjoining the family home Goldsborough Hall. After his paternal grandfather's death in 1929, he was styled as Viscount Lascelles as his father succeeded to the earldom. He served as a Page of Honour at the coronation of his uncle King George VI in May 1937.

He was raised at Harewood House in Yorkshire. He was educated at Ludgrove School, Eton College and King's College, Cambridge. His time at university was interrupted by the Second World War.

Military service
Lascelles joined the British Army where he was commissioned as a second lieutenant into the Grenadier Guards (his father's regiment) in 1942, attaining the rank of captain. He fought with the 3rd Battalion of the regiment, part of the 1st Guards Brigade of the 78th Infantry Division (the brigade was later transferred to the 6th Armoured Division), serving in North Africa and Italy, but was wounded and captured at Monte Corno on 18 June 1944, the anniversary of both his father's injury in the First World War and the Battle of Waterloo, in which his great-great-grandfather was injured.

He was held as a prisoner of war in Oflag IV-C (Colditz) until May 1945. As the nephew of King George VI, Lascelles was one of the Prominente at Colditz, considered a potential bargaining chip by the Nazis.

In March 1945, Hitler signed his death warrant; the SS general in command of prisoner-of-war camps, Gottlob Berger, realizing the war was lost, refused to carry out the sentence and released the Viscount to the Swiss.

In 1945–46, he served as aide-de-camp to his great uncle, Lord Athlone, who was then Governor General of Canada.  Lord Harewood served as a Counsellor of State in 1947, 1953–54, and 1956.

House of Lords
Lascelles succeeded his father in 1947. On 7 February 1956, he took his seat in the House of Lords. He lost his seat in the Lords following the House of Lords Act of 1999, which excluded hereditary peers from membership.

Career

Opera 
A music enthusiast, Lord Harewood devoted most of his career to opera with his Yorkshire heritage fostering his interest; in March 1949, as a young single man, he had been among the audience at the Leeds Town Hall for a  performance of operatic works by the Yorkshire Symphony Orchestra. By 1950, he had become patron of the orchestra's concerts. He served as editor of Opera magazine from 1950 to 1953. In February 1950, it was reported that he had launched the magazine at a large party at the London house of Richard Buckle with many music-loving guests in attendance. He was director of the Royal Opera House, Covent Garden from 1951 to 1953 and again from 1969 to 1972. He served as chairman of the board of the English National Opera (ENO) from 1986 to 1995; Managing Director of the ENO from 1972 to 1985 and was Artistic Director of both the Edinburgh and Adelaide Festivals. From 1958 to 1974, he was General/Artistic Director of the Leeds Triennial Musical Festival. He was Managing Director of the ENO offshoot English National Opera North from 1978 to 1981. Lord Harewood served as a governor of the BBC from 1985 to 1987 and as the president of the British Board of Film Classification from 1985 to 1996.

He was the author or editor of three books, Kobbé's Complete Opera Book (ed. 1954, now The New Kobbé's Opera Book, edited with Antony Peattie, latest ed. 1997; and The New Pocket Kobbé's Opera Book, edited with his step-son Michael Shmith, 2000), The Tongs and the Bones (an autobiography, 1981), and Kobbé's Illustrated Opera Book (ed. 1989). He was chairman of Historic Masters, an unusual vinyl record label dedicated to high-quality issues of rare historic 78 rpm recordings of opera singers. He was a noted friend and colleague of the late opera diva Maria Callas and is featured in the 1968 EMI documentary The Callas Conversations Vol. I, during which he interviewed Callas at length concerning her career and ideas about opera.

Football 
His other interests included football: he served as president of Leeds United Football Club from 1961 until his death and was president of the Football Association from 1963 to 1972. He died on 11 July 2011, aged 88.

Public life 
Lascelles was the only person to serve as Counsellor of State without being a Prince of the United Kingdom, serving from 1945 to 1951, then from 1952 to 1956. He served as chancellor of the University of York from 1962 to 1967. He was ranked number 1355 in the Sunday Times Rich List 2008 with an estimated wealth of £55 million—his magnificent art treasures, held in trust and valued at more than £50 million, and a  estate outside Leeds. The estate and house, Harewood House, are held by a charity with £9 million of assets, and were not counted as part of his wealth.

Honours 

Queen Elizabeth II created him a Knight Commander of the Order of the British Empire (KBE) in the Queen's Birthday Honours List on 13 June 1986. On 1 July 2010 he was appointed an Honorary Member of the Order of Australia (AM), "for service to the arts in Australia and to supporting Australia's artists in the United Kingdom".

In 1959, Harewood received the Grand Decoration in Silver with Sash for Services to the Republic of Austria.

Marriages and children 

On 29 September 1949 at St. Mark's Church, London, Lord Harewood married Marion Stein, a concert pianist and the daughter of the Viennese music publisher Erwin Stein. Because of Harewood's position in the line of succession, the marriage was subject to approval from the sovereign, under the Royal Marriages Act 1772. Queen Mary, mother of George VI, objected to the marriage but permission was eventually granted. Benjamin Britten, a friend of the Stein family, composed an anthem, "Amo Ergo Sum", for the wedding ceremony.

Lord and Lady Harewood had three sons:

 David, 8th Earl of Harewood, born 21 October 1950. He married Margaret Messenger on 12 February 1979; they were divorced in 1989. They have four children and seven grandchildren. He married Diane Howse on 11 March 1990. 
 James Lascelles, born 5 October 1953. He married Fredericka Duhrrson on 4 April 1973; they were divorced in 1985. They have two children and one granddaughter. He married secondly Lori Lee on 4 May 1985; they were divorced in 1996. They have two children and one grandson. He married thirdly Joy Elias-Rilwan on 30 January 1999.
 Jeremy Lascelles, born 14 February 1955. He married Julie Bayliss on 4 July 1981; they were divorced. They have three children and five grandchildren. He married Catherine Bell on 7 January 1999. They have a daughter.

The earl's marriage to Marion Stein ended in divorce in 1967, after the earl's mistress, Patricia "Bambi" Tuckwell - an Australian violinist and sister of the musician Barry Tuckwell - gave birth to his son. This was considered an enormous scandal at the time, and caused the couple to be ostracised for some years, even after their relationship was made legal. Stein went on to marry politician Jeremy Thorpe.

Lord Harewood married Tuckwell (24 November 1926 – 4 May 2018) on 31 July 1967. The wedding took place at Waveny Park in New Canaan, Connecticut. They were obliged to be married abroad as, in England, registry office marriages were barred at the time for persons covered by the Royal Marriages Act, and divorcees could not marry in the Church of England. They had one son, Mark Hubert Lascelles, born 4 July 1964. He married, first, Andrea Kershaw (born 16 June 1964) on 8 August 1992 and divorced in 2005. They have three daughters. He married Judith Ann Kilburn on 16 July 2011.

Death 

Lord Harewood died peacefully at home, on 11 July 2011, aged 88 years. A private, but well-attended stately home funeral was held on 15 July.

Books 

The Tongs and the Bones: The Memoirs of Lord Harewood, published by George Weidenfeld & Nicolson (1981),  is George Lascelles' autobiography

References

External links 

 George Lascelles, 7th Earl of Harewood interview by Bruce Duffie
 Obituary, The Daily Telegraph, 12 July 2011.
 Appearance on Desert Island Discs 26 December 1981
 Archival Material at 

1923 births
2011 deaths
20th-century English businesspeople
Alumni of King's College, Cambridge
British Army personnel of World War II
British World War II prisoners of war
Chancellors of the University of York
7
English Anglicans
English football chairmen and investors
Grenadier Guards officers
Honorary Members of the Order of Australia
Honorary Members of the Royal Philharmonic Society
George
Knights Commander of the Order of the British Empire
Opera critics
Opera managers
Opera North
Pages of Honour
People educated at Eton College
People educated at Ludgrove School
Presidents of the Football Association
Prisoners of war held at Colditz Castle
Recipients of the Grand Decoration with Sash for Services to the Republic of Austria
Sportspeople from Yorkshire
Harewood